Kafshgiran (also Romanized as Kafshgīrān and Kafshgarān) is a village in Gudarzi Rural District, Oshtorinan District, Borujerd County, Lorestan Province, Iran. At the 2006 census, its population was 1,434, with 356 families.

References 

Towns and villages in Borujerd County